Nikolai Nikolayevich Andreyev (28 July 1880 – 31 December 1970) was a physicist who specialized in the study of music and acoustics. The Andreyev Acoustics Institute and a research vessel Akademik Nikolai Andreyev are named after him.

Andreyev was born to a government official, Nikolai Fedorovich and Alexandra Nikitichna Konvisarova. After the death of his parents in a fire, he was brought up by relatives in Moscow. He went to the classical gymnasium and after graduating in 1892, joined the military school where he studied mathematics and European languages, apart from excelling in music. He joined the Higher Technical Institute in 1898 but was expelled for taking part in student agitations. He was influenced by Nikolai Bugaev and in 1903 he went to study at the University of Göttingen and then moved to Basel to study under August Hagenbach. He worked on optics and examined approaches to identification of active components using polarization measurements. After receiving his doctorate he worked in Moscow in the laboratory of Pyotr Lebedev. During World War I he was involved in developing methods for locating guns using sounds. From 1918 he was professor of physics at Omsk and in 1920 he moved to Moscow to study acoustics with Abram Ioffe. He also studied piezoelectricity, microphones, and the production of sounds by animals. He received a Order of Lenin in 1945 and 1953 and was decorated Hero of Socialist Labour in 1970.

References 

1880 births
1970 deaths
Full Members of the USSR Academy of Sciences
University of Basel alumni
Heroes of Socialist Labour
Recipients of the Order of Lenin
Recipients of the Order of the Red Banner of Labour
Physicists from the Russian Empire
Soviet physicists
Burials at Novodevichy Cemetery